Mee Aayana Jagratha is 1998 Indian Telugu-language comedy film, produced by Usha Rani, C. Kalyan under the Sri Ammulya Art Productions banner and directed by Muthyala Ramadas, with Vallabhaneni Janardhan's direction supervision. It stars Rajendra Prasad and Roja, with music composed by Koti and Vinayak Rao. The film was recorded as a flop at the box office. The movie was a loose adaptation of the 1975 Tamil movie Yarukku Maappillai Yaro.

Plot
The film begins on Gopi Krishna (Rajendra Prasad), an unemployed youth who acquires a job in a company headed by a military Major (Vallabhaneni Janardhan). Major's only daughter Sundari (Roja) loves and marries him but she asks for some time for their first night. Due to this, Gopi is attracted towards a prostitute Raksha (Raksha). So, he hires his close friend Bosu's (Sivaji Raja) house to spend time with Raksha. Unfortunately, Sundari arrives therein, hence, Gopi introduces Raksha as Bosu's wife. After some comic incidents, Bosu marries his love interest Latha (Latha Sri) and the situation deteriorates, Latha misjudges Raksha as Gopi's wife. Here, Sundari misconstrues, spotting Bosu with Latha, contrariwise Latha too. The rest of the story is a funny confusing drama that how Gopi gets rid of these problems.

Cast
Rajendra Prasad as Gopi Krishna
Roja as Sundari
Brahmanandam as Robert
Sivaji Raja as Bosu
Vallabhaneni Janardhan as Major
M. S. Narayana as Minor
Duvvasi Mohan as Robert's henchman
Raksha as Raksha
Latha Sri as Latha

Soundtrack

Music composed by Koti. Music released on SWETHA Audio Company.

Reception 
A critic from Deccan Herald wrote that "While Muthyala Ramdas makes his debut as director, senior artiste Vallabhaneni Janardhan has written the story and screenplay. The musical score by newcomer Vinayak is just average. Double-edged dialogues by Marudhuri Raja succeed in adding new synonyms to the dictionary of risque words".

References

External links 

Films scored by Koti
1990s Telugu-language films